Bhandāsura is an asura who appears in Hindu literature, most prominently in Shaktism. He is featured in the Lalita Mahatmaya of the Brahmanda Purana, where he is slain by the goddess Lalita.

Legend 
The battle between Goddess Lalita Tripura Sundari and Bhandasura is described in the Lalitopakhyana of Brahmanda Purana and Jnana Khanda of Tripura Rahasya.

Lord Shiva married Sati, the daughter of the king Daksha. Sati's father did not invite Shiva to a great sacrifice as Daksha and Shiva were dissatisfied with each other. Sati, however, went to attend the ceremony despite Shiva's opposition. Daksha insulted Lord Shiva in front of Sati and she jumped into the fire to end his humiliation, killing herself. As a result, Shiva beheaded Daksha, but when Shiva's anger subsided, he revived him with a goat's head. Adi Parasakti was also reborn as Parvati as a result of a favor bestowed on King Himavan, and Tarakasura, an enemy of the gods, was privileged to make his death possible only for the son of Shiva and Shakti. Due to this, the gods sought the help of Kamadeva, the Hindu deity of love to unite Shiva and Parvati. Manmata aimed his flower arrows at Shiva and Parvati to make them feel loved. Angered by this, Shiva turned Kama into ashes with his third eye.

Some time later, at the request of his son Ganesha, Shiva gave birth to an asura named Bhandasura from the ashes of Kama. Bhandasura was created from the ashes of Kamadeva and performed severe austerities to please Lord Shiva, for which he rewarded with the boons that whomsoever dares to fight with him, would forfeit half of his strength and masculinity to him. Bhanda was also given the city of the demons Shonithapura to live in and promised emperorhood of the multiverse for sixty thousand years without any obstruction in his path. He created two Asuras Vishanga and Vishukra from his shoulders, from his heart he created his sister, Dhumini. He also bought to life four wives with whom he had thirty sons in total and a daughter named Rashmiprabha. Fearing him and his vicious boons, the gods of the multiverse went into hiding where they worshipped the God Parashakti, for the last few thousand years of Bhandasura's uninterrupted rules, while he was immersed in lust and luxury by Lord Vishnu's Maya. When Bhandasura discovered the gods' conspiracy against him, he attacked them at the spot where they performing Yajna to appease the goddess Lalitha. In fear the Devas entered into the fire pit and immolated themselves. When a relieved Bhandasura had gone, the goddess Parasakthi incarnated as goddess Lalitha and resurrected Devas of the multiverse and restored their duties.

The Devas searched for consort for Lalitha and finally Kameshwara married her and Vishwakarma created an abode for Lalitha is Manidvipa which was the abode of Mahadevi and recreated the universe. From her various organs, she created the worlds, Pancha Bhutas, then she created Bala Tripurasundari from her heart. Gayatri from her Kundalini, Varahi from her ego and Matangi from her intellect, Sampathkari from Ankusha and Ashwarooda from her Pasha and other Devis like Nakuleshwari and Jwalamalini. Goddess Tripura Sundari went to war against Bhandasura with an army enough to destroy him and his inhabitants of Shonithapura. Her army led by Sampathkari Devi of the elephant regiment and Ashwarooda Devi as the caption of the cavalry in horse. She herself went on the Sri Chakra, which was created by architect Vishwakarma. The Chakraraja Ratha, with every weapon known to God and man alike. Her commander-in-chief Dandini Devi followed on the Giri Chakra and her prime minister Manthrini Devi followed on the Geya Chakra. The war was in favour of Lord Tripura Sundari. Bhandasura created many Asuras like Kutilaaksha, Durmnada kuranda, Karanka, Kaalavaasita, Vajradanta, Vajramukha, Vajraloma, Vikata, Vikataasana, Karaalaaksha, Karkataka, Dirgha Jihva, Humbaka, Karkasha, Pulkasa, Pundraketu, Jrumbhakaaksha, Tikshna shringa, Yamantaka, Atimaya, Ulukajitat, Kujvilaashwya, Attahasa, Mushaka, and Kumbhotkacha. Ashwarooda Devi killed Karanka, Sampathkari Devi killed Durmada, Karanka and five Daitya Senapatis were then despatched who created a ‘Rana Maya’ called Sarpini which created poisonous flames and showered serpents but Nakuleshwari Shakti utilised Garudaastra and also showered Mongooses. As Karanka and five other Senapatis were destroyed, Bhandasura and Kutilaksha instructed seven more Senapatis to face the attack from the side of Devi; these Senapatis were all born to Rakshasi Keekasa (born of bones) and were named Baalaka, Soochi Mukha, Phaalamukha, Vikarna, Vikataanana, Karaalaayu and Karataka. The Sapta Senapatis were asked to proceed with three hundred Akshouhinis of army to attack Lalita Devi directly. But the invincible Shaktis displayed their penchant for blood-drinking and apart from the Sapta Senapatis the massive army was destroyed. Then the Nitya Shaktis aimed their arrows and killed countless Daityas; Kameshwari killed Damana, Bhagamala shot straight into the Senanayaka Dirghajihva, Nityaklinna annihilated Humbeka, Bherunda Shakti thrashed Hulumallaka, Vahni vaasaa Shakti crushed Kaklusa, Maha Vajreswari Shakti destroyed Kesivahana, Shivaduti Shakti sent Plukasa to Yamapuri, Twarita cut Pundraketa into pieces; Kulasundari smashed Chandabahu, and so on. Later, Lalitha sent Bala Tripurasundari and successfully killed thirty sons of Bhandasura. While Manthrini killed Vishanga and Dandini killed Vishukra. Before dying however, Vishukra had placed a jaya-vighna-yantra in the middle of the Goddess’s troops. This froze everyone except Lalita, Bala Tripurasundari, Kameshwara, Matangi and Varahi.

Devi Lalita then, with her husband in the form of Kameshwara, created Mahaganapati (the highest form of Ganesha), who destroyed Vishukra's yantra, thus reanimating the other goddesses. Goddess also created Maha Subramanya (highest form of Kartikeya). After his brothers were slain by the goddess Lalita, Bhandasura swore vengeance upon her. Bhandasura now created many Asuras from Mahaasurastra like Madhu-Kaitabha, Dhumralochana, Chanda and Munda, Raktabīja, Sumbha and Nisumbha and Mahishasura. Later Lalitha created Goddess Durga who slayed them . On seeing this Bhandasura again created many Asuras killed by Dashavatara of Lord Vishnu like Hiranyakashipu, Hiranyaksha, Mahabali, Kartavirya Arjuna, Ravana, Indrajit, Kumbhakarna and many others. Later Lalitha created Dashavatara of Lord Vishnu from her fingernails and killed them and destroyed Mahaasurastra. The Mother put out every firebrand sent by the demon her way, and destroyed his army with the Maha-Pashupatastra. She finally killed Bhandasura and destroyed Shonitapura with the Kameshwarastra. With Bhandasura incinerated by her arrow, the Goddess recreated Kamadeva from his ashes and restored Rati's marriage and peace to the multiverse.

References

Asura
Hinduism
Shaktism